Intiman Theatre Festival in Seattle, Washington, was founded in 1972 as a resident theatre by Margaret "Megs" Booker, who named it for August Strindberg's Stockholm theater. With a self-declared focus on "a resident acting ensemble, fidelity to the playwright's intentions and a close relationship between actor and audience", the Intiman soon called itself as "Seattle's classic theater". Its debut season in 1972 included Rosmersholm, The Creditors, The Underpants, and  Brecht on Brecht.  The theater has been host to Tony-nominated Director Bartlett Sher (who served as both a director and artistic director), Tony-nominated actress Celia Keenan-Bolger, and movie actor Tom Skerritt. It was also home to the world premieres of the Tony-winning Broadway musical The Light in the Piazza, Craig Lucas's Singing Forest and Dan Savage's "Miracle!". Lucas also served as the Associate Artistic Director.  Intiman won the 2006 Regional Theatre Tony Award.

In April 2011, Intiman Theatre recognized the need to pause, reflect and relaunch with a financially sustainable and artistically vibrant new model. After listening to input from artists, audiences, funders and the community, Intiman launched its first summer theatre festival in July and August 2012 under the leadership of Artistic Director Andrew Russell and Managing Director Keri Kellerman. The festival, curated from the impulses of an artist collective, featured four plays and a repertory company of 17 actors who stretched through over 40 roles. The Intiman Theatre Playhouse was renamed the Cornish Playhouse in 2013 and is now managed by the Cornish College of the Arts.

In 2017, Phillip Chavira became Intiman's first Executive Director, and first person of color to lead this organization. At the end of 2017, Andrew Russell completed his tenure as Producing Artistic Director and Jennifer Zeyl became Intiman's seventh Artistic Director.

History

Intiman's original location was a 65-seat theater in Kirkland, Washington. Under the leadership of artistic directors Megs and John Booker, the Intiman officially incorporated as a non-profit theatre in 1973. Over the next few years, the company mounted productions at Cornish College and Gary Austin's Second Stage Theatre in Seattle, growing in attendance and budget each season. By 1978, Intiman called itself "Seattle's Classic Theatre" and featured a resident company of fourteen actors, including Megan Cole, Clayton Corzatte, Ted D'Arms, John Gilbert, Patricia Healy, Richard Riele, Peter Silbert, Meg Hilton, Barry Mulholland, and Jean Smart.

In 1977, Intiman opened year-round administrative offices in Pioneer Square and hired Simon Siegl as its first general manager. With a season of five classic plays, Intiman also began a parallel program "New Plays Onstage", staged readings of contemporary works directed and performed by members of the ensemble. Over the next several years, Intiman was awarded institutional status by the King County and Washington State Arts Commissions and received an NEA challenge grant.

After a three-year planning process Intiman participated in the 1982 Scandinavia Today, an international exposition of Nordic culture, which took place in five American cities. Intiman presented staged readings of five contemporary works and two great classics on its main stage: The Wild Duck and A Dream Play, in collaboration with top Scandinavian directors, designers and playwrights.

Meanwhile, Second Stage, Intiman's venue for nine theatrical seasons, faced demolition to make way for the Washington State Convention Center. For several years, Intiman, unlike any other professional resident theatre in the area, operated without a permanent home. Under the continued leadership of Booker and Siegl, Intiman rented various performance venues around the city on a  short term, basis, including Broadway Performance Hall on the campus of Seattle Central Community College.

This picture changed radically after 1985, when Peter Davis came aboard as Intiman's first managing director. Davis—a former scenic designer who had worked for both Intiman and Seattle Repertory Theatre—completely restructured Intiman's finances and administration. He successfully negotiated the plan for Intiman to operate and manage a theatre facility on the grounds of Seattle Center. That facility, the Seattle Center Playhouse (later Intiman Playhouse and later Cornish Playhouse) had been built for the Century 21 Exposition (the 1962 Seattle World's Fair), and had then served as the original home of the Seattle Repertory Theatre. In 1982, the Rep had moved to a new facility elsewhere on the Seattle Center grounds. Intiman received a 22-year lease from the City. After a US$1.2 million renovation, in 1987, for the first time in its history, Intiman had a single facility with performance, rehearsal, production, shop and administrative areas. As it moved into its new facility, Intiman hired a new artistic director, Elizabeth Huddle, who served for the next six years, succeeded in 1993 by Warner Shook.

In 1994, Intiman became the first regional theatre company in the country to be awarded the rights to produce Tony Kushner's Tony- and Pulitzer-winning two-part epic Angels in America. Part One: Millennium Approaches closed Intiman's 1994 season, and Part Two: Perestroika opened the 1995 season. Directed by Shook, the complete Angels in America was the most commercially successful production ever to be produced at the theatre, reaching more than 63,000 attendees over its two-year run. Over the next decade, Intiman produced plays by such provocative and influential American writers as Edward Albee, Moisés Kaufman, Ellen McLaughlin, Terrence McNally, David Rabe, Anna Deavere Smith, Paula Vogel, and Chay Yew.

Recent history

 In 2008 Intiman completed a project entitled The American Cycle, a series of five plays written by prominent Americans— four of which were not originally written as plays. They were:
 Thornton Wilder's Our Town (2004)
 adapted John Steinbeck novel The Grapes of Wrath (2005)
 adapted Richard Wright novel Native Son (2006)
 adapted Harper Lee novel To Kill a Mockingbird (2007), and
 adapted Robert Penn Warren novel All the King's Men (2008)

 A new project, The New American Cycle, began in 2009 with Robert E. Sherwood's Abe Lincoln in Illinois.
 During 2008–2010 Intiman was transitioning from one group of leaders to the next. Laura Penn departed as Managing Director in March, 2008. Her replacement, Brian Colburn, officially started in November, 2008 but did not move to Seattle until early 2009.  Colburn resigned Nov. 1, 2010.  Kate Whoriskey succeeded Bartlett Sher as Artistic Director in 2010.  Originally the plan was for them to jointly manage the first season of the transition, but that changed when Mr. Sher departed in March, 2010.
 On April 16, 2011 the Board of Trustees voted to close the Intiman Theatre and lay off the entire staff, including Artistic Director Kate Whoriskey.  In November, 2010 the Intiman had found that the theatre was $2.3 million in debt and had begun a fundraising effort to pay overdue expenses and reduce debt.  However, shortly after the season opened, the Board decided that the financial situation would compel the Board to close the theatre, temporarily.  The Board engaged Susan Trapnell, a consultant, to advise it on a plan to reopen the theatre in 2012.

 On August 5, 2011 the first performance of Seattle Theatresports took place, the show having previously been performed in the Gum Wall Theatre in Pike Place Market.
 The 2013 Summer Festival featured productions of: (1) "Trouble in Mind" by Alice Childress; (2) "We Won't Pay! We Won't Pay!" by Dario Fo; "(3) Lysistrata" by Aristophanes; and (4) "STU For Silverton", a new musical about Stu Rasmussen, American's first known transgender mayor.
 The 2016 Summer Festival featured productions of: (1) "Stick Fly" by Lydia R. Diamond; (2) "Wedding Band: A Love/Hate Story in Black and White" by Alice Childress.
 The 2017 Summer Festival featured productions of: (1) "Barbecue" by Robert O'Hara; (2) "Dragon Lady", a new musical by Sara Porkalob.

Notable Intiman artists
 Bartlett Sher – former Artistic Director, 2000–2010
 Craig Lucas – Associate Artistic Director
 Tom Skerritt – Actor
 Stacy Keach – Actor
 Reiko Aylesworth – Actor
 John Aylward – Actor
 Celia Keenan-Bolger – Actor
 Patti Cohenour – Actor
 Laurence Ballard – Actor
 Jeanne Paulson – Actor
 Barbara Dirickson – Actor

References

External links
 Intiman official website
 

1972 establishments in Washington (state)
Buildings and structures in Seattle
Culture of Seattle
Seattle Center
Theatre companies in Washington (state)
Theatres in Washington (state)
Tony Award winners
Regional theatre in the United States
Tourist attractions in Seattle